Josephine Jue (born 1946) is a Chinese-American computer programmer and mathematician who is best known for being the first Asian-American woman working in NASA, where she worked for 37 years. Jue is a founding member of the Chinese Baptist church of Houston, Texas.

Early life
Jue was born in Vance, Mississippi, into a Mississippi Delta Chinese family. She received a bachelor's degree in mathematics from the University of Houston.

Work for NASA
Jue joined NASA in 1963, being one of eight women at the time, and the sole Asian-American woman. She worked for NASA for 34 years, where she held four different positions. She worked as a compiler for the Space Shuttle program and also worked for Apollo 11. She also was the chief of NASA's Software Engineering Laboratory (SEL) in 1975. She is best known for development, implementation and maintenance of the HAL/S system during the Space Shuttle program.

References

External links

1946 births
Living people
20th-century American mathematicians
20th-century women mathematicians
21st-century American mathematicians
American computer programmers
American people of Chinese descent
American women mathematicians
Baptists from Mississippi
Mathematicians from Mississippi
NASA people
People from Quitman County, Mississippi
People from Tallahatchie County, Mississippi
University of Houston alumni
20th-century American women
21st-century American women